Philtech Institute of Arts and Technology Inc. (PIAT or Philtech) is a technical institution in Lucena, Gumaca, and Catanauan in the province of Quezon, Philippines.
It provides technical skills training in services sectors such on Tourism and Travel Services, Information and Communication Technology, Health, Social and other Community Development Services.

History
Philtech was organized in 2012, when Engr. Flores Cabangon-Valderrama from Technological Institute of the Philippines, Amiel Valderrama from Far Eastern University, and Orlando G. Umali from University of Santo Tomas set up the Philtech Institute of Arts and Technology Inc. to train and develop young Filipinos for jobs in various service sectors that are in demand based on data from the Dept. of Labor and Employment (DOLE).

See also
List of universities and colleges in the Philippines

References
 http://www.tesda.gov.ph/inc/tvidetails.aspx?institution=Philtech%20Institute%20of%20Arts%20and%20Technology%20Inc.

Universities and colleges in Lucena, Philippines
Educational institutions established in 2014
2014 establishments in the Philippines